Speak to Me of Love (French: Parlez-moi d'amour) is a 1975 French drama film directed by Michel Drach and starring Louis Julien, Nathalie Roussel and Andréa Ferréol.

Cast
 Louis Julien as Daniel 
 Nathalie Roussel as Anne 
 Andréa Ferréol as La voisine 
 Michel Aumont as Le père de Daniel 
 Joëlle Bernard as La mère de Daniel 
 Nelly Borgeaud as La belle mère 
 Zouc as La soeur d'Anne 
 Jean Topart as Le quinquagénaire 
 Jacques Canselier as Le jockey 
 Pierre Destailles as M. Osaye 
 Monique Lejeune as Mme Bourget 
 Gérard Hérold as M. Bourget 
 Philippe Clévenot as Le psychologue 
 Patrick Le Mauff as Le 'Prince charmant' 
 André Valardy as Le directeur du théâtre 'Chocolat' 
 Robert Dadiès as Le metteur en scène 
 François Guillaume as L'infirmier

References

Bibliography 
 Rège, Philippe. Encyclopedia of French Film Directors, Volume 1. Scarecrow Press, 2009.

External links 
 

1975 films
1975 drama films
French drama films
1970s French-language films
Films directed by Michel Drach
Gaumont Film Company films
1970s French films